A partial solar eclipse will occur on Wednesday, October 4, 2051. A solar eclipse occurs when the Moon passes between Earth and the Sun, thereby totally or partly obscuring the image of the Sun for a viewer on Earth. A partial solar eclipse occurs in the polar regions of the Earth when the center of the Moon's shadow misses the Earth.

Related eclipses

Solar eclipses 2051–2054

References

External links 
 http://eclipse.gsfc.nasa.gov/SEplot/SEplot2051/SE2051Oct04P.GIF

2051 in science
2051 10 4
2051 10 4